Holey Artisan Bakery is a bakery headquartered in Dhaka, Bangladesh. It was described in The New York Times "as among the most beloved restaurants in Dhaka". It is a sister company of Izumi.

History
The restaurant was originally located on Road 79 Gulshan-2 near the diplomatic quarters of Dhaka. Its clientele consisted of locals and the expat community in Dhaka.

The bakery was attacked by terrorists on 1 July 2016. In the attack, 18 foreigners, including 9 Italians and 7 Japanese were killed. The restaurant was closed after the attack, before reopening in the ‘Rangs Arcade’ building at Gulshan, described as more secure by the restaurant on 10 January 2017. In 2019, a second branch was opened at 'Rangs FC Square' also in Gulshan, which is now renamed as ORO.

The bakery owners plan to turn the former building that housed the restaurant into a residence for themselves.

In September 2016, Holey Artisan opened their first overseas branch in Bangkok, Thailand shortly before reopening in Dhaka. There are currently three braches in Bangkok.

References

2015 establishments in Bangladesh
Restaurants in Dhaka
Bakeries